Lancelot Phelps (November 9, 1784 – September 1, 1866) was a United States representative from Connecticut. He was the father of James Phelps who was also a United States Representative from Connecticut. He was born in Windsor, Connecticut, before moving with his family to Colebrook, Connecticut, in 1794. He attended the common schools and the studied medicine and commenced practice in Colebrook, Connecticut. He also engaged in agricultural and mercantile pursuits in Riverton, Connecticut. Later, he returned to Colebrook.

Phelps held various local offices. He was a member of the Connecticut House of Representatives in 1817, 1819–1821, 1824, 1827, 1828, and 1830. He was elected as a Jacksonian to the Twenty-fourth Congress and reelected as a Democrat to the Twenty-fifth Congress (March 4, 1835 – March 3, 1839). He died in Colebrook, Connecticut, in 1866 and was buried in Center Cemetery, Winsted, Connecticut.

Footnotes

References

1784 births
1866 deaths
Democratic Party members of the Connecticut House of Representatives
Jacksonian members of the United States House of Representatives from Connecticut
Democratic Party members of the United States House of Representatives from Connecticut
19th-century American politicians